Alena Kucera is a former Swiss slalom canoeist who competed from the late 1970s to the early 1980s. She won a bronze medal in the K-1 team event at the 1979 ICF Canoe Slalom World Championships in Jonquière.

References

External links 
 Alena KUCERA at CanoeSlalom.net

Swiss female canoeists
Living people
Year of birth missing (living people)
Medalists at the ICF Canoe Slalom World Championships